Scioto Trail State Forest is a state forest in Pike and Ross counties in the U.S. state of Ohio. Scioto Trail State Park lies within the state forest.

References

Ohio state forests
Protected areas of Pike County, Ohio
Protected areas of Ross County, Ohio